Ousethorpe is a small hamlet in the East Riding of Yorkshire, England.

It forms part of the civil parish of Millington.

References

External links

Villages in the East Riding of Yorkshire